The 2022–23 UEFA Nations League A is the top division of the 2022–23 edition of the UEFA Nations League, the third season of the international football competition involving the men's national teams of the 55 member associations of UEFA. League A will culminate with the Nations League Finals in June 2023 to determine the champions of the competition.

Following their win in 2021, defending champions France were unable to retain their title in the finals after finishing third in their group.

Format
League A consists of the 16 top-ranked UEFA members in the 2022–23 UEFA Nations League access list, split into four groups of four. Each team played six matches within their group, using the home-and-away round-robin format in June (four matchdays) and September 2022 (two matchdays). The winners of each group advanced to the 2023 UEFA Nations League Finals, and the fourth-placed team from each group was relegated to the 2024–25 UEFA Nations League B.

The Nations League Finals will take place in June 2023 and be played in a knockout format, consisting of the semi-finals, third place play-off and final. The semi-final pairings will be determined by means of an open draw. The host country will be selected among the four qualified teams by the UEFA Executive Committee, with the winners of the final crowned as the champions of the UEFA Nations League.

The four group winners were drawn into groups of five teams for UEFA Euro 2024 qualifying (in order to accommodate for the Nations League Finals).

Teams

Team changes
The following are the team changes of League A from the 2020–21 season:

Seeding
In the 2022–23 access list, UEFA ranked teams based on the 2020–21 Nations League overall ranking. The seeding pots for the league phase were confirmed on 22 September 2021, and were based on the access list ranking.

The draw for the league phase took place at the UEFA headquarters in Nyon, Switzerland on 16 December 2021, 18:00 CET. Each group contained one team from each pot.

Groups
The fixture list was confirmed by UEFA on 17 December 2021, the day following the draw. The fixture list for Group 4 was amended due to the postponement of Path A of UEFA qualifying for the World Cup.

Times are CEST (UTC+2), as listed by UEFA (local times, if different, are in parentheses).

Group 1

Group 2

Group 3

Group 4

Nations League Finals

The four nations from Group A4 (Belgium, the Netherlands, Poland and Wales) bid to host the Nations League Finals. As the nation that qualified for the finals, the Netherlands was granted hosting rights. The semi-final pairings were determined by means of an open draw on 25 January 2023, 11:00 CET, at the UEFA headquarters in Nyon, Switzerland. For scheduling purposes, the host team is allocated to semi-final 1 as the administrative home team.

Bracket

Semi-finals

Third-place play-off

Final

Goalscorers

Overall ranking
The 16 League A teams will be ranked 1st to 16th overall in the 2022–23 UEFA Nations League according to the following rules:
The teams finishing first in the groups will be ranked 1st to 4th according to the results of the Nations League Finals.
The teams finishing second in the groups were ranked 5th to 8th according to the results of the league phase.
The teams finishing third in the groups were ranked 9th to 12th according to the results of the league phase.
The teams finishing fourth in the groups were ranked 13th to 16th according to the results of the league phase.

Euro 2024 qualifying play-offs

The four best teams in League A according to the overall ranking that failed to qualify for UEFA Euro 2024 through the qualifying group stage, will compete against each other to win one extra qualification spot through the path A play-offs. If the qualifying group stage results in less than four un-qualified teams from League A, the first available slot for the teams participating in the path A play-offs, will be allocated to the best-ranked group winner of League D, subject to not already having qualified in the qualifying group stage. The remaining available slots will be allocated to the best ranked un-quallified teams from league B or league C (excluding group-winners of league B/C and teams previously chosen to participate in the path B play-offs and path C play-offs).

Key
GW Group winner from Nations League A, B or C
 Team is assured at least a play-off spot based on Nations League ranking, but may still qualify directly
 UEFA Euro 2024 host, qualified automatically

The path A play-offs were previously held in a similar fashion to decide one extra qualification spot for UEFA Euro 2020.

Notes

References

External links

League A